Alexander Topay (born 20 August 1955) is an Austrian modern pentathlete. He competed at the 1980 Summer Olympics, finishing in 35th place in the individual event.

References

External links
 

1955 births
Living people
Austrian male modern pentathletes
Olympic modern pentathletes of Austria
Modern pentathletes at the 1980 Summer Olympics
Sportspeople from Innsbruck
20th-century Austrian people